Rezaabad (also Romanized as Reẕāābād) is a village in Azadegan Rural District, in the Central District of Rafsanjan County, Kerman Province, Iran. At the 2006 census, its population was 1,217, in 297 families.

References 

Populated places in Rafsanjan County